The most successful teams in women's international rugby union have been England, France, and New Zealand.

Fifteens

Current playing records

25 matches or more

10-24 matches

Fewer than 10 matches

Year of first international
1982: : (1); (1)
1984: : (3)
1985: : (4)
1986: : (6); (5)
1987: : (9); (7); (9); (7)
1989: : (11); (10)
1990: : (12); (13); World XV(14)
1991: : (15)
1993: : (16); (18);(16)
1994: : (20); (19)
1995: : (21)
1998: : (22)
2000: : (23)
2003: : (24); (26); (24); (26)
2004: : (29); (31); (29); (28)
2005: : (34); (32); (32); (34)
2006: : (40); (36); (39); (38); (40);(37)
2007: : (42); (42); (42); (42); (46); (46)
2008: : (48); (49); (49)
2009: : (51); (53); (52)
2010: : (54);  Caribbean XV (55)
2011: : (57); (58); (56)
2013: : (59); (59)

Year of last international
2014 : ; ;  ; ; ; ; ; ; ; ; ; ; ; ; ; ; ; ; ; 
2013 : ; ; ; ; 
2012 : ; ; ; ; ; 
2011 :  Caribbean Select XV; ; ; ; 
2010 : ; ; ; 
2009 : ; ; 
2008 : ; ; ; 
2007 : ; ; ;
2006 : ; 
2005 : ; ; 
2004 : 
1995 : 
1991 : 
1990 :

Official rankings

IRB World Ranking
Although the IRB produce a complex and continually updated ranking for men's international rugby they do not compile any ranking system for the women's game. Rugby statistician Serge Piquet has produced a currently unofficial, but generally accepted, world ranking, but where rankings are referred to by some boards these will normally be the finishing positions in the previous Women's Rugby World Cup (which only takes place every four years and will only include those countries that qualified for the finals).

The IRB's seedings for each World Cup are also influenced by positions in the previous tournament, but not entirely decided by them. The table below shows the final positions for the 2014 tournament and is therefore the closest thing to an "official" IRB ranking:

Rugby Europe Ranking
Rugby Europe, formerly known as FIRA-AER, do produce an annual ranking of European nations, based on previous season's Rugby Europe and Six Nations competitions, for use in RE tournaments (though Six Nations teams are often given a higher seeding in tournaments than their ranking might suggest). As these will be based on more recent performances they can contradict the IRB list and also include countries not featuring in the World Cup-based ranking. On the other hand, they obviously only include European nations. Rankings  (based on previous season results) appear to be:

Sevens

Current playing record (to end of 2011)
Detailed results from a small number of tournaments, especially in Africa and Asia, have never been published. The following table therefore relates to the published tournament results. Note: Almost all of New Zealand's sevens matches - apart from the 2009 World Cup and qualifier and two Hong Kong Sevens - have been played by "Aotearoa Maori" and (before 2000) "New Zealand Wild Ducks". While in some cases they were officially sanctioned by the NZRU, neither were full New Zealand teams, and occasionally included players not eligible to play for New Zealand. As a result, they are not included in the table below. The playing record of these unofficial New Zealand teams is: Played 59, Won 55, Lost 4, 93.22%.

Year of first international

Official rankings

IRB World Ranking
As with rankings for 15-a-side rugby, IRB rankings for Sevens are based on the finishing positions in the previous World Cup. The table below shows the final positions for the 2009 tournament:

Rugby Europe Ranking
Rugby Europe also produce an annual ranking of European nations, based on previous season's RE championships which are used for the following season's tournaments. Current rankings are:

References